National Highway 548D, commonly referred to as NH 548D is a national highway in  India. It is a spur road of National Highway 48. NH-548D traverses the state Maharashtra in India.

Route  
Talegaon Dabhade, Chakan, Shikrapur, Nhavare, Kasthi, Srigonda, Jalgaon, Jamkhed, Patoda (Beed), Manjarsumba, Kaij, Ambajogai, Ghatnandur, Kingaon, Kopra, Patoda (Ahmedpur), Kajal Hipparga Ahmedpur.

Junctions  

  Terminal near Talegaon Dabhade.
  Terminal near Ahmedpur.

See also 

 List of National Highways in India
 List of National Highways in India by state

References

External links 

 NH 548D on OpenStreetMap

National highways in India
National Highways in Maharashtra